European route E 83 is a road part of the International E-road network. It begins in Byala, Bulgaria and ends in Botevgrad, Bulgaria.

The road follows: Byala - Pleven - Yablanitsa - Botevgrad.

See also 
Roads in Bulgaria
Highways in Bulgaria

External links 
 UN Economic Commission for Europe: Overall Map of E-road Network (2007)

83
E083